Kariba Ferries is a Zimbabwean ferry operator which operates on Lake Kariba between the fishing camp of Mlibizi (with access to Victoria Falls) in the south and Kariba town in the north. It offers an alternative to an overland journey of  taking 8 hours. The relaxing voyage by boat takes approximately 22 hours.

Catering
Catering is provided on board: three meals are served through the course of the voyage along with morning and afternoon tea with access to a cash bar on board.

Fleet

References

External links
Kariba Ferries website

Transport companies of Zimbabwe
Ferry transport in Africa
Ferry companies
Lake Kariba